Awaza (or Avaza) refers to both a tourist zone in and a borough (district headed by a presidentially appointed mayor) of the city of Türkmenbaşy, Turkmenistan. It is located on the eastern shore of the Caspian Sea, 12 km west of downtown Türkmenbaşy. 

The Awaza District (borough) of Türkmenbaşy city was formed in July 2013. Awaza District, an area of 9660 hectares, includes the Awaza national tourist zone, Turkmenbashi International Airport and a small residential area. 

The tourist zone was commissioned by President Gurbanguly Berdimuhamedow, who sought to imitate Dubai's development boom. Turkmenistan's foreign ministry has touted Awaza as a "Turkmen Las Vegas" but foreign reports on the project have found that the accommodations are underutilized and hold little attraction apart from their sheer excess.

Awaza is also used as a conference site, particularly for the annual Turkmenistan Gas Conference.

See also 
 Awaza Convention Center
 Districts of Turkmenistan
 Tourism in Turkmenistan
 Türkmenbaşy, Turkmenistan
 Yacht Club Yelken

References

Balkan Region